Andoniaina Rakotondrazaka Andrianavalona (born 25 September 1987) is a Malagasy international footballer who plays for CNaPS Sport, as a midfielder.

Career
He has played club football for CNaPS Sport and Ajesaia.

He made his international debut for Madagascar in 2017.

References

1987 births
Living people
Malagasy footballers
Madagascar international footballers
CNaPS Sport players
Ajesaia players
Association football midfielders
Madagascar A' international footballers
2022 African Nations Championship players